Darüşşafaka Society, the first non-governmental organization in Turkish history in the field of education, was founded in 1863 with the mission of providing “equity in education.” Bright and talented children who have lost one of their parents and who have limited financial resources become eligible to study at Darüşşafaka after passing a competitive exam when they are ten years old, and Darüşşafaka provides them access to quality education at international standards. In its 150 years of existence, Darüşşafaka has maintained its position to be the only school in Turkey with the specific mission of providing equity in education.

Today, at Darüşşafaka, 954 children from 68 different provinces of the country receive boarding co-education in English with a full scholarship from the 5th grade until high school graduation. Spending 24 hours and 7 days a week at Darüşşafaka, their students not only receive a high quality education but also develop their personal skills and social orientation that enable them to become leaders in different segments of the society, nationally and internationally.

History

From the apprenticeship training of the Grand Bazaar to the modern education Of today
The original purpose of the society founded by Gazi Ahmet Muhtar Pasha, Vidinli Tevfik Pasha, Sakızlı Ahmet Esat Pasha and Ali Nâki Efendi under the leadership of Yusuf Ziya Pasha, a prominent mathematician, soldier and statesman of the time, was to finance the training of the Grand Bazaar's young craftsmen. The society renovated the old Valide School in Beyazit, and thereafter many intellectuals including the national poet Namık Kemal joined the school as volunteer teachers. 

In 1868, the Society commenced construction of the Ottoman Empire's first building built specifically for the purpose of education; up until this time, the common practice was to use old barracks or mansions as school buildings. The school, located in Istanbul's Fatih district, was designed by the Italian architect Barironi and planned by Dolmabahçe Palace's chief architect Ohannes Balyan. The school, which was suitable for both girls and boys to study under the same roof and which offered facilities and opportunities way ahead of its time, opened its doors as a free boarding school pursuant to a private statute in June 1873, under the name "Darüşşafakat'ül İslamiye." Ever since, the Society has continued its efforts to provide financing for the education of students studying at Darüşşafaka.

In the late 1800s, the number of Western-style schools in Turkey could be counted on one hand. The main characteristic that distinguished Darüşşafaka from these other schools was its embrace of an "equality of opportunity in education" mission from its very first day. The Society provided needy children without fathers with a high quality education whereas similar schools generally catered to the children of wealthy families. Although the Society has altered its curriculum, name, and location over the years, it has never deviated from its original mission of improving the lives of children via education.

From the past to the future: the Darüşşafaka family
In addition to the primary elements of Darüşşafaka Society and the Darüşşafaka Schools, the Darüşşafaka family consists of the following: Darüşşafaka residences (Yakacık, Maltepe, Şenesenevler and Urla residences), Urla Yaşam, Maltepe Special Care Unit, Ömran and Yahya Hamuluoğlu Physical Therapy and Rehabilitation Center, Darüşşafaka Alumni Association and Darüşşafaka Sports Club. Yusuf Ziya Paşa, a prominent statesman in his time, together with four associates, laid the foundations of this long-respected Turkish family. These five idealists who embarked upon a path to provide a right to education to needy children established the first educational NGO in Turkey, Cemiyet-i Tedrisiyye-i İslâmiye. 
The Society’s building in Istanbul's Fatih district was the first in Turkey to be built exclusively for educational purposes. Originally committed to providing education to children who had lost their fathers, the Society changed its charter on April 14, 2012, to include children who have lost their mothers. Darüşşafaka is the oldest educational NGO in Turkey which has a school of its own.

Current activities

Creating a 24/7 vibrant environment for students
On the academic front, Darüşşafaka Schools apply the curriculum devised by the Turkish Ministry of National Education, but with the help of the most advanced teaching methodologies, instruments and international programs, Darüşşafaka enables the students to experiment on what they learn in the classroom. In the 5th and 6th grades, students participate in the international “Children as Researchers Program” to improve their research skills. Darüşşafaka currently offers 11 science labs, computer labs in various locations, a fully equipped and extensive library, and also a planetarium & observatory on the campus. At Darüşşafaka, the language of instruction is Turkish and English. Beginning in the 6th grade, students learn French or German as a second foreign language. The objective of the academic program is to prepare students for life by developing their inquisitive instincts and research skills, and help them become self-confident individuals.

In addition to the academic activities, students also actively participate in the social clubs according to their interests and abilities. There are 64 different clubs offered to students this year at Darüşşafaka, ranging from mechatronics and astronomy to Model United Nations and Destination Imagination. While the students enjoy on-campus activities on Saturdays, such as sports, music, chess, drama and painting, they spend their Sundays off-campus, by attending specifically organized events like theatre, museum visits, ice skating, fishing or walking along the Bosphorus.

Teachers as lifelong learners
Currently, 125 teachers and 27 tutors, including nine non-Turkish teachers work at Darüşşafaka Schools, where professional development of teachers is a priority.

Donations from the public
Darüşşafaka Society is recognized as a non-profit organization and receives no financial support from the state budget. Darüşşafaka’s entire operational budget (including cost of education and cost of living such as housing, food, clothing, health care, books, cultural activities, monthly allowance, and also scholarships for students who graduate from Darüşşafaka and gain admission to top universities in Turkey and abroad) is completely supported by donations and grants from philanthropic citizens, charitable institutions and corporations who believe in the mission of Darüşşafaka.

Valuable support from charitable institutions
Currently, Darüşşafaka’s major institutional supporter is Türkiye İş Bankası (İşbank). Since 2008, as part of the “81 Students from 81 Provinces” project, Türkiye İş Bankası generously covers all tuition and living expenses of 81 new students admitted to Darüşşafaka each year. Thanks to their support, Darüşşafaka has been able to reach more children living in Anatolia. Since 2008, approximately 70% of children admitted to Darüşşafaka come from outside of İstanbul, from various provinces of Turkey. Among Darüşşafaka’s other leading supporters are institutions such as Doğuş Holding, Procter & Gamble, JP Morgan, HSBC, Mehmet Zorlu Foundation, Siemens, Microsoft, Datateknik and TÜYAP Fair and Exhibition Organization.

Retirement and nursing homes available for elderly donors
For 150 years, Darüşşafaka Society owes its existence to philanthropic individuals who support its mission and contribute to changing children's future through the education they receive at Darüşşafaka. As an expression of gratitude to its philanthropic donors, Darüşşafaka provides elderly care to its donors at the retirement and nursing homes it operates in İstanbul and İzmir. While the residents of Darüşşafaka homes contribute to providing a future to the children of this country, they also spend their retirement years in a safe, comfortable and peaceful environment.

Since 1863, Darüşşafaka has been the symbol of “Equity in Education” and will continue to be.

External links
 

Educational institutions established in 1863
Education in Turkey
Organizations based in Istanbul
1863 establishments in the Ottoman Empire